Nelsan Ellis (November 30, 1977 – July 8, 2017) was an American actor and playwright. He achieved critical acclaim for his portrayal of Lafayette Reynolds in the HBO television series True Blood (2008–2014), for which he won a Satellite Award from the International Press Academy, among other accolades. He also starred as Shinwell Johnson in Elementary from 2016 to 2017, and played a variety of guest roles in other television series, including Veronica Mars and Without a Trace.

In addition to his television work, Ellis appeared in several feature films throughout his career. He portrayed Eddie Sweat in the Disney sports drama Secretariat (2010), was Martin Luther King Jr. in Lee Daniels' The Butler (2013), and was Bobby Byrd in the 2014 James Brown biopic Get on Up. His final acting role was in True to the Game, which was released posthumously.

Early life 
Ellis was born in Harvey, Illinois, near Chicago, the son of Jackie Ellis and Tommie Lee Thompson. When Ellis and his siblings were young, their mother, a single parent after her divorce, broke down after the death of her brother. Ellis and his siblings became wards of the state, and later were raised in Bessemer, Alabama, by their maternal grandmother. He was diagnosed with dyslexia in second grade.

In Alabama, Ellis attended Jess Lanier High School for a year and transferred to McAdory High School. He moved back to Illinois at age 15, where he lived with his maternal aunt. In 1997 he graduated from Thornridge High School in Dolton, Illinois.

He joined the United States Marine Corps at the age of 17, but quit not long afterward. Following this, Ellis attended Illinois State University.

In 2000, at the age of 22, he was accepted for enrollment at the Juilliard School, where he befriended Rutina Wesley, later a colleague in the series True Blood. Ellis earned a Bachelor of Fine Arts degree from Juilliard in 2004.

Career 
Ellis began his acting career in the early 2000s, with a role in the short film Lost. In 2005, he starred in the television film Warm Springs. From 2005 to 2006, he played the recurring role of Carter Howard in the television series The Inside. He followed this up with guest roles in Veronica Mars and Without a Trace, both in 2007.

In mid-2007, Ellis was cast as Lafayette Reynolds in the pilot for True Blood, as a short-order cook at Merlotte's Bar & Grill, a drug dealer, a member of Jason Stackhouse's road crew, and Tara Thornton's cousin. The pilot was shot in the early summer of 2007 and was officially ordered to series in August. Production on the series began later that fall.

In casting Lafayette Reynolds, Alan Ball had concerns because the character's homosexuality would be a dominating trait. He said "you don't want to bring in someone who's going to play that in a phony way". Nelsan Ellis said that it took him a few episodes to find the character. Ellis has said that he based many of Lafayette's mannerisms on his mother and his sister, and that the costuming also helped him to get into character. He told The Philadelphia Inquirer:

True Blood premiered on September 7, 2008, and concluded on August 24, 2014, comprising seven seasons and 80 episodes. In 2008, Ellis received a Satellite Award from the International Press Academy for best supporting actor in a television series for his role as Lafayette Reynolds. In 2009, he was nominated for a Scream Award for Best Supporting Actor. In 2011, he won the NAACP Image Award for Outstanding Supporting Actor in a Drama Series for his performance in True Blood.

Ellis also performed in several feature films; his early roles include The Express: The Ernie Davis Story (2008) and The Soloist (2009). In 2010, he portrayed Eddie Sweat in the Disney sports drama Secretariat.

In 2012, Ellis was cast as Martin Luther King Jr. in a supporting performance in Lee Daniels' The Butler. The Butler received mostly positive reviews from critics, with a 71% rating on the film critic aggregate site Rotten Tomatoes, based on 171 reviews.

The following year, Ellis joined the cast of Get on Up, a biographical drama film about the life of singer James Brown. He portrayed Bobby Byrd, Brown's longtime friend. Get on Up was met with positive reviews from critics.

From 2016 to 2017, Ellis starred as Shinwell Johnson in the TV series Elementary. His character dies near the end of Season 5. The first episode to air after Ellis' death, the season 6 premiere, ended with the screen "In Memory of Our Friend Nelsan Ellis". His final acting role was in True to the Game, which was released posthumously.

Death 
Ellis died at the age of 39 on July 8, 2017, in Woodhull Medical Center in Brooklyn, New York. His family released a statement on July 10, 2017, saying that he had an ongoing struggle with drug and alcohol abuse. He had been reluctant to talk to anyone about his addiction because of his sense of shame. In the days prior to his death, Ellis was attempting to withdraw from alcohol on his own; he was hospitalized due to serious complications from alcohol withdrawal syndrome, which resulted in his death. Ellis was survived by his son, Breon Ellis.

Awards and nominations 
While at Juilliard, Ellis wrote a semi-autobiographical play entitled Ugly, which was performed at the school and later won the Lincoln Center's Martin E. Segal Award. The play was influenced by his pregnant sister's murder at the hands of her husband.
2008 – Satellite Award from the International Press Academy for best supporting actor in a television series for his role as Lafayette Reynolds in HBO's True Blood.
2009 – NewNowNext Awards Brink of Fame: Actor award.
2009 – Ewwy Award for Best Supporting Actor in a Drama Series for True Blood.
2009 – Scream Award for Best Supporting Actor for True Blood.
2011 – NAACP Image Award for Outstanding Supporting Actor in a Drama Series for True Blood.

Filmography

Film

Television

References

External links 
 

1977 births
2017 deaths
21st-century American male actors
African-American male actors
American male film actors
American male television actors
Juilliard School alumni
Male actors from Alabama
Male actors from Illinois
Military personnel from Illinois
People from Bessemer, Alabama
People from Harvey, Illinois
United States Marines
21st-century African-American people
20th-century African-American people
Alcohol-related deaths in New York City
Drug-related deaths in New York City